Nadine Joy Nathan (born 29 December 1999) is a Singaporean female artistic gymnast, representing her nation at international competitions.

She competed at world championships, including the 2014 Youth Olympic Games, and the 2015 World Artistic Gymnastics Championships in Glasgow.

References

External links

1999 births
Living people
Singaporean female artistic gymnasts
Place of birth missing (living people)
Gymnasts at the 2014 Summer Youth Olympics
Southeast Asian Games silver medalists for Singapore
Southeast Asian Games bronze medalists for Singapore
Southeast Asian Games medalists in gymnastics
Gymnasts at the 2018 Asian Games
Competitors at the 2015 Southeast Asian Games
Competitors at the 2017 Southeast Asian Games
Asian Games competitors for Singapore
Gymnasts at the 2022 Commonwealth Games